Khyber Pass Road is a street in the Auckland City Centre, New Zealand, connecting Upper Symonds Street to Broadway in Newmarket. The road is intersected by both the Western Line and the Auckland Southern Motorway.

History

Khyber Pass began life as a dirt track, during the early settlement of Auckland in the 1840s. As the road was seen as a dangerous frontier, it was named after the Khyber Pass in modern-day Pakistan, which at the time was glamorised as the frontier of British India. The road, along with Great South Road, was a part of the route used by soldiers travelling south during the Invasion of the Waikato in the 1860s. The spelling Kyber Pass was commonly used, up until the early 1940s.

The part of the road close to Newmarket was known as Hobson's Bridge, referring to an old wooden bridge that existed on modern-day Davis Crescent, which crossed Hobson's Creek, a former waterway. The road was the southern border of the township of Auckland in 1852, so that an ordinance stopping lose cattle could be applied to a larger area.

During the late 1850s and 1860s, the land adjacent to Khyber Pass was subdivided and sold as suburban housing, including sections such as the Kyber Pass Village and Kyber Pass Estate.

The area became a centre for brewers in the mid-19th century, due to the presence of a natural spring. The Captain Cook Inn opened by Thomas Hancock on the road in 1859. Originally brewing beer just for the tavern, by 1862 the brewery had become a commercial venture for Hancock. Richard Seccombe opened a brewery opposite the Inn in 1861 called the Great Northern Brewery, later known as Lion Brewery.

In 1872, the Auckland City Council purchased land on Khyber Pass, where water reservoirs and pumping stations were established.

The Captain Cook Inn was demolished in 1968. The last brewery site on the road was the Lion Brewery, which sold its premises in 2008, and was later redeveloped as a satellite campus of the University of Auckland.

Notable locations
Church of the Holy Sepulchre, Anglican church built in 1881 to replace the church that was a part of the Anglican section of the Symonds Street Cemetery.
Grafton railway station, a railway station on the Western Line which opened in 2010, replacing the earlier Boston Road railway station to the southwest.
Number Four Khyber Reservoir, a water reservoir at the corner of Symonds Street and Khyber Pass.
St David's Presbyterian Church, a church which opened in 1927 as a World War I memorial and Presbyterian church, and closed in 2020.
St Peter's College, a Catholic boys' secondary school which opened their Khyber Pass in 1939.
The University of Auckland Newmarket Campus, an engineering and science campus in the former Lion Brewery site.

Gallery

References

Auckland CBD
Streets in Auckland